Austin Junction is an unincorporated community in Grant County, Oregon, United States. It is at the intersection of U.S. Route 26 and Oregon Route 7, about 2.5 miles south of Austin in the Wallowa–Whitman National Forest. The Austin House, a combination café, grocery store, gas station and tavern at this location is named after an early business in nearby Austin. The business is located on Forest Service land and operates with a special-use permit. Austin Junction has a Bates, Oregon mailing address. The elevation is 4,236 feet (1291 m).

References

External links
Image of Austin House from the Oregon Scenic Images for Grant County from Oregon State Archives
Image of the Middle Fork John Day River near Austin Junction from the Oregon State Archives
Road condition camera at Austin Junction from Oregon Department of Transportation

Unincorporated communities in Grant County, Oregon
Unincorporated communities in Oregon